Hrubieszów is a town in southeastern Poland, with a population of around 18,212 (2016). It is the capital of Hrubieszów County within the Lublin Voivodeship.

Throughout history, the town's culture and architecture was strongly shaped by its Polish Roman Catholic, Greek Catholic and Jewish inhabitants. Almost all of the Jewish community of the town, however, were murdered in the Holocaust. Hrubieszów is also the birthplace of Polish writer, novelist and author of popular books Bolesław Prus, and entrepreneur and Holocaust survivor Henry Orenstein.

History 

The area formed part of the Cherven Cities, a territory which was included within the emerging Polish state in the 10th century by its first historic ruler Mieszko I. It was invaded and annexed from Poland by the Kievan Rus' in 981, and afterwards it changed owners several times between Poland and the Rus', and even fell to the Mongol Empire in the mid-13th century. The origins of the town go back to the early Middle Ages, when a defensive gord existed on the Huczwa river island. It was first mentioned in 1254, as a hunting settlement located among forests.

In 1366, the area, along with Hrubieszów, then called Rubieszów, was eventually recaptured by King Casimir III the Great, and reintegrated with the Kingdom of Poland. Some time in the late 14th century, a wooden castle was built here, as a residence of a local governor. Probably in 1400 Rubieszów received a town charter from Polish king Władysław II Jagiełło, who visited it in 1411, 1413 and 1430. A castle and church were later added. King Casimir IV Jagiellon ordered the construction of a route from Lublin to Lwów passing through Rubieszów. The town was destroyed several times by Crimean Tatars, who raided this area in the 15th, 16th and 17th centuries, and by the rebellious Cossacks.

After the First Partition of Poland in 1772, Hrubieszów was annexed by Austria. In 1800, Stanisław Staszic founded the Hrubieszów Agricultural Society, the first cooperative organization in Europe, which existed until 1945. The name of the town was changed in 1802 from Rubieszów to Hrubieszów. Following the Austro-Polish War of 1809 the town became part of the short-lived Polish Duchy of Warsaw, then in 1815 it became part of Russian-controlled Congress Poland, within the Lublin Governorate. In 1909, its population was 15,000. In the final weeks of World War I, in November 1918, a newly formed Polish unit from Chełm liberated the town. It was integrated with reborn Poland, within which it was administratively part of the Lublin Voivodeship.

During the joint German-Soviet invasion of Poland, which started World War II, the German army entered the town on 15 September 1939. Ten days later the Germans withdrew and the Soviet army occupied the town, but after a fortnight returned it to the Germans, in accordance with a new Soviet-German agreement. During the German occupation, the region witnessed the Zamość Uprising. Many inhabitants, including almost all of the 7,000 Jewish residents, were murdered in the Holocaust. In 1944, the German occupation ended, and the town was restored to Poland, although with a Soviet-installed communist regime, which stayed in power until the Fall of Communism in the 1980s.

After World War II, what remained of the town's Ukrainian population was expelled to the Soviet Union. In May 1946, the town was the site of the largest joint action by the partisans of the Polish anti-communist Freedom and Independence movement and those of the Ukrainian Insurgent Army.

Between 1975 and 1998, the town was administratively part of the Zamość Voivodeship.

Jewish Community 
The Jewish population numbered 709 in 1765, 3,276 in 1856, 5,352 (out of 10,636) in 1897, in 1921, there were 5679, and probably around 7500 in 1939.

During World War II, the German army immediately organized a series of pogroms after it invaded the town on 15 September 1939. Over 2,000 Jews, having experienced the Nazi German terror, left with the withdrawing Soviet army, which shortly occupied the town after 25 September 1939. On 2 December 1939, 1,000 Jews from Hrubieszów and 1,100 from Chełm were led on a death march to the Bug River. Hundreds were murdered along the way, survivors were forced to try to swim across the Bug to the USSR, but the Soviets did not permit them to enter.  The survivors returned to Hrubieszów.  In August 1940, Germand and Polish police arrested about 800 Jews and deported 600 to a forced labor camp where about half died.  Sometime between the summer of 1940 and June 1942, an Occupation ghetto was formed.  Both local Jews and those forced to move to Hrubieszów were confined to a fixed area.  By April 1942, there were more than 5800 Jews in the ghetto.

In June 1942, around 3,000 Jews from the ghetto were rounded up, some were killed in the town, and most were sent to the Sobibor extermination camp where they were all killed. The second deportation from Hrubieszów took place on 28 October 1942, when 2,500 Jews were deported to Sobibor and killed. About 140 of Hrubieszów 's Jews are thought to have survived. They were mostly those who had fled to Soviet controlled territory at the beginning of the war.

Jewish resistance 
In the summer of 1941, Julek (Joel/Jakób) Brandt, a leader of the Zionist youth movement  Betar from Chorzów who was a relative of the chairman of the Hrubieszów Judenrat (Jewish Council) Samuel Brandt, arranged for several hundred members of the Betar youth movement in the Warsaw Ghetto to work on local farms and estates, including one in Dłużniów and Werbkowice. Before the war, the estate in Dłużniów had belonged to Maks Glazermann, a Jewish engineer from Lwów who was left to run the property. Among those sent to Dłużniów was a young woman from Warsaw named Hanka Tauber. Her account of what went on there was recorded in the ghetto diary of Abraham Lewin.

Most of the Betar youth were killed in the spring of 1942 and in subsequent months together with the local Jewish population. A small number, however, managed to return to the ghetto and later took part in the Warsaw Ghetto uprising. Julek Brandt escaped from a transport heading for the Sobibor extermination camp. He was denounced by locals who tuned him over to the Gestapo in Hrubieszów. There he was put to work by Gestapo Obersturmbannführer Ebner, who named him chief of a small work camp on Jatkowa Street. At the end of 1942 or the beginning of 1943, Brandt was executed by Ebner.

Transport 
National road 74 runs through the town, continuing to the road border crossing with Ukraine at Zosin-Ustyluh located about 20 km to the east. In 2015 the road was rerouted to a newly built bypass avoiding the town centre. A wide gauge Hrubieszów–Sławków Południowy LHS railway runs through the town. A normal gauge railway runs parallel to it, which carries two pairs of PKP Intercity trains, first through southern Poland to Jelenia Góra and second through northern-central Poland to Piła. Lublin Airport is the closest international airport, located about 120 km away by road.

Heritage sights and monuments

Hrubieszów boasts a number of monuments:
 Birthplace of writer Bolesław Prus
 An outdoor sculpture of Bolesław Prus
 Saint Nicholas Catholic Church (17th-century)
 Orthodox church with 13 cupolas (1875)
 Madonna of Ceaseless Help Catholic Church (1903-5).
 Du Château manor complex, housing a regional museum.
 Madonna of Sokal Catholic Church.
 Jewish cemeteries (Old and New)

Sports
 sports club is based in Hrubieszów, with football, athletics and weightlifting sections.

Notable people

Notable residents of Hrubieszów have included:

 Abraham Stern 1762-1842, inventor 
 Yosef Almogi (1910–1991), member of the Israeli Knesset
 Bolesław Leśmian (1877–1937), poet
 Henry Orenstein (born 1923), toymaker, poker player, author, and entrepreneur
 Bolesław Prus (1847–1912), novelist
 Milton Rokeach (1918–1988), psychologist

Others with ancestry from the city include:

 David Mamet (born 1947), American playwright
 Zalman Shazar (1889–1974), third President of Israel

See also
List of cities and towns in Poland

References

External links 
 Official website of Hrubieszów
 Hrubieszów information service
 Hrubieszów Jewish genealogy site
 Official Hrubieszów County website 

Cities and towns in Lublin Voivodeship
Hrubieszów County
Shtetls
Ruthenian Voivodeship
Lublin Governorate
Kholm Governorate
Lublin Voivodeship (1919–1939)
Holocaust locations in Poland